The Estonia men's national under-20 basketball team is the national under-20 basketball team of Estonia and is controlled by the Estonian Basketball Association, the governing body for basketball in Estonia. It represents the country in international men's under-20 basketball competitions.

FIBA U20 European Championship participations

See also
Estonia men's national basketball team
Estonia men's national under-18 basketball team
Estonia women's national under-20 basketball team

References

External links

Archived records of Estonia team participations

under
Basketball
Men's national under-20 basketball teams